Department of Films and Publications is a Bangladesh government department, under the Ministry of Information, responsible for regulating the film and publication industries. S M Golam Kibria is the Director General of the department. It is located in Circuit house road, Dhaka, Bangladesh.

History
Department of Films and Publications was established in 1971 by the government of Bangladesh in exile in Kolkata during the Bangladesh Liberation war. It is the government regulatory department that provides licenses for publications and films. It is also responsible for publishing and producing work on the history of Bangladesh. Newspapers, magazines, and other publications are registered with the department. It is responsible for Bangladesh Film Archive, responsible for archiving films made in Bangladesh. On 1 March 2017, Bangladesh Betar announced that they would work with Department of Films and Publications to produce programs for radios in Bangladesh that would  highlight the development activities of the government.

References

Government departments of Bangladesh
1971 establishments in Bangladesh
Organisations based in Dhaka